Phantasies II is an album by the American jazz pianist Jaki Byard with the Apollo Stompers, recorded in 1988 and released on the Italian Soul Note label. The album follows Byard's big band tributes album Phantasies (1984).

Reception
The AllMusic review by Scott Yanow awarded the album 2½ stars stating "The second CD featuring Jaki Byard's Apollo Stompers (a young big band) is actually superior to the first one. Although most of the soloists remain obscure, the material is more stimulating than on the debut set... His very versatile piano has its share of short solos, hinting at many earlier jazz styles".

Track listing
All compositions by Jaki Byard except as indicated
 "Manhattan" (Lorenz Hart, Richard Rodgers) - 1:57 
 "New York Is a Lonely Town" (Peter Andreoli, Vini Poncia) - 4:30 
 "2-5-1" - 5:38 
 "BJC Blues (Dedicated to B.B. King)" - 4:05 
 "Up Jumps One (Dedicated to Count Basie)" - 7:20 
 "Concerto Grosso Part 1: Mellow Septet" - 5:11 
 "Concerto Grosso Part 2 : There Are Many Worlds" - 4:38 
 "June Night" (Abel Baer, Cliff Friend) - 2:29 
 "Send in the Clowns" (Stephen Sondheim) - 2:38 
 "Bright Moments" (Rahsaan Roland Kirk) - 3:46 
Recorded at Sound Ideas Studios in New York City on August 23 & 24, 1988

Personnel
Jaki Byard – piano
Roger Parrot, Al Bryant, Graham Haynes, Jim White - trumpet
Steve Calial, Rick Davies, Steve Swell, Carl Reinlib - trombone
Bob Torrence, Susan Terry - alto saxophone
Jed Levy, Bruce "Bud" Revels - tenor saxophone
Don Slatoff - baritone saxophone
Peter Lieich - guitar
Ralph Hamperian - bass
Richard Allen - drums
Vincent Lewis, Diane Byard - vocals

References

Black Saint/Soul Note albums
Jaki Byard albums
1988 albums